Desmond Hilton Patton (1912 – 2 November 2003) was the Archdeacon of Ossory and Leighlin from 1962 until 1976.

Fahy was educated at Trinity College, Dublin and ordained in 1937. He began his career with curacies at Killermogh, Wexford and Mothel. He held Incumbencies in Ardoyne (Carlow), Clonenagh and Carlow.

He died on 2 November 2003.

References

Alumni of Trinity College Dublin
Archdeacons of Ossory and Leighlin
20th-century Irish Anglican priests
1912 births
2003 deaths